The Colombia national basketball team (Spanish: Selección de baloncesto de Colombia) represents Colombia in men's international basketball competitions and organized and run by the Colombia Basketball Federation (Federación Colombiana de Baloncesto).

In South America, Team Colombia made some considerable improvements in the last decade but still stands in the shadow of the Big Four Basketball Powers (Team Argentina, Team Brazil, Team Venezuela and Team Uruguay). Its best result to date remains the 7th place at the 1982 FIBA World Championship where Colombia was host.

In 2017, Colombia appeared at the FIBA AmeriCup, the Americas' prime basketball event, for the first time. Colombia's standout player, Juan Palacios, Power forward in the Basketball Champions League returned to the national team for the first time since 2009.

Competitive record

FIBA World Cup

FIBA AmeriCup
 2017: 11th
 2022: 9th

Pan American Games

1951: 10th
1967: 10th
1971: 10th
2019: To Be Determined

South American Championship

Team

Current squad
Roster for the 2022 FIBA AmeriCup

Depth chart

Head coach position
  Guillermo Moreno: 2001–2006
  Hernán Darío Giraldo: 2008–2012
  Tomás Díaz: 2014
  Guillermo Moreno: 2016–present

Past rosters
Scroll down to see more.
2008 South American Championship: finished 5th among 6 teams

Coach: Hernán Darío Giraldo

At the 2016 South American Basketball Championship:

See also
Colombia national under-19 basketball team
Colombia national under-17 basketball team
Colombia women's national basketball team
Colombia national 3x3 team

References

External links
FIBA Profile
Colombia Basketball Records at FIBA Archive
Latinbasket – Colombia Men National Team
Colombian Basketball News 

 
Men's national basketball teams
1939 establishments in Colombia